Ret finger protein like 4B is a protein that in humans is encoded by the RFPL4B gene.

References

Further reading